Igerna neosa is a species of leafhopper from Madagascar.

References 

Insects described in 1980
Insects of Madagascar
Megophthalminae